The fifth season of the AMC television series Better Call Saul premiered on February 23, 2020, in the United States, and concluded on April 20, 2020. The ten-episode season was broadcast on Mondays at 9:00pm (Eastern) in the United States, except for the premiere which aired on a Sunday. Bob Odenkirk, Jonathan Banks, Rhea Seehorn, Patrick Fabian, Michael Mando, and Giancarlo Esposito reprise their roles from previous seasons and are joined by Tony Dalton, promoted to the main cast from his recurring role in the previous season. Better Call Saul is a spin-off prequel to Breaking Bad and was also created by Vince Gilligan; co-creator Peter Gould also worked on the series.

The fifth season picks up where the fourth left off, also taking place in 2004, four years before Jimmy McGill (Odenkirk) meets Walter White (Bryan Cranston) and Jesse Pinkman (Aaron Paul). The season shows the further evolution of Jimmy into the titular character, criminal defense lawyer "Saul Goodman", after regaining his law license, while fully rejecting the goodwill that Howard Hamlin (Fabian) extends to him in the wake of his brother Chuck's death. Kim Wexler (Seehorn) is dismayed by Jimmy's secretive and sporadic nature as well as her own willingness to go along with Jimmy's morally-ambiguous motives to move ahead in her casework. Lalo Salamanca's (Dalton) presence in Albuquerque disrupts Gus Fring's (Esposito) legitimate restaurant business and his reputation with the Juárez Cartel. Both Nacho Varga (Mando), fearing for his father's safety, and Mike Ehrmantraut (Banks), who is struggling to cope with his killing of Werner Ziegler, are caught between Gus and Lalo's conflict, eventually drawing Jimmy and Kim in.

The fifth season received universal acclaim from critics, particularly for its performances and heightened tension compared to earlier seasons, and four nominations at the 72nd Primetime Emmy Awards, including for Outstanding Drama Series.

Cast and characters

Main 

 Bob Odenkirk as Jimmy McGill / Saul Goodman, an attorney recently reinstated to the New Mexico bar association who now practices criminal defense law as Saul Goodman. In the present, he manages a Cinnabon store in Omaha under the alias Gene Takavic.
 Jonathan Banks as Mike Ehrmantraut, a Madrigal corporate security consultant and "fixer" for Gus Fring's criminal ambitions.
 Rhea Seehorn as Kim Wexler, primarily a corporate banking lawyer with a moral passion for public defense cases and Jimmy's girlfriend/wife and legal confidant.
 Katie Beth Hall portrays a young Kim in a flashback in "Wexler v. Goodman".
 Patrick Fabian as Howard Hamlin, the sole managing partner of Hamlin, Hamlin & McGill following Chuck McGill's death in the third season.
 Michael Mando as Nacho Varga, a lieutenant in the Juárez cartel, now overseeing daily operations in Albuquerque; torn between the vicious Salamanca enforcers and Gus Fring's ambitions for removal of Don Eladio, his allegiance is co-opted by Fring, after trying to kill Hector Salamanca.
 Tony Dalton as Lalo Salamanca, acting head of the brutal Salamanca family of (Juárez cartel) enforcers and a "fixer" for Don Eladio's Albuquerque distribution.
 Giancarlo Esposito as Gus Fring, Chilean national, now Albuquerque narcotics distributor under Don Eladio's Juárez cartel; using his fried chicken chain, Los Pollos Hermanos, as a legitimate front.

Recurring 
 Mark Margolis as Hector Salamanca, a once brutal drug enforcer who, following a stroke, has been left unable to walk or speak.
 Max Arciniega as Krazy-8 Molina, a meth distributor working for Nacho.
 Sasha Feldman and Morgan Krantz as Sticky and Ron, a pair of drug users and petty criminals who become Jimmy's clients.
 Josh Fadem as Camera Guy, a UNM film student who helps Jimmy on various projects and schemes.
 Hayley Holmes as Make-up Girl, a UNM film student.
 Julian Bonfiglio as Sound Guy, a UNM film student.
 Kerry Condon as Stacey Ehrmantraut, Mike's widowed daughter-in-law and the mother of Kaylee Ehrmantraut.
 Jeremiah Bitsui as Victor, one of Gus's henchmen.
 Ray Campbell as Tyrus Kitt, one of Gus's henchmen.
 Juan Carlos Cantu as Manuel Varga, Nacho's father and an owner of an upholstery shop.
 Dean Norris as Hank Schrader, a DEA agent; reprising his role from Breaking Bad.
 Steven Michael Quezada as Steven Gomez, an Albuquerque DEA agent; reprising his role from Breaking Bad.
 Dennis Boutsikaris as Rich Schweikart, founding partner of Schweikart & Cokely, Kim's boss.
 Barry Corbin as Everett Acker, the homeowner contesting eviction from property that Mesa Verde plans to use for a call center.
 Rex Linn as Kevin Wachtell, CEO of Mesa Verde Bank & Trust.
 Cara Pifko as Paige Novick, senior counsel at Mesa Verde Bank & Trust.
 Lavell Crawford as Huell Babineaux, professional pickpocket, Jimmy's security and fixer.
 Javier Grajeda as Juan Bolsa, a Juarez drug cartel underboss.
 Peter Diseth as Bill Oakley, deputy district attorney.
 Keiko Agena as Viola Gotto, Kim Wexler's paralegal.

Guests
 Robert Forster as Ed Galbraith, a vacuum cleaner repairman who creates new identities for fugitives; reprising his role from Breaking Bad and El Camino.
 Stefan Kapičić as Casper, a member of Werner Ziegler's construction crew.
 Don Harvey as Jeff, the cab driver that recognized Gene as Saul Goodman.
 Ben Bela Böhm as Kai, the demolitions expert on Werner Ziegler's construction crew.
 JB Blanc as Barry Goodman, a doctor on Gus Fring's payroll.
 Steven Ogg as Sobchak / Mr. X, a criminal and private investigator.
 Ed Begley Jr. as Clifford Main, founding partner of the Davis & Main law firm, who employs Jimmy in the second season.
 Norbert Weisser as Peter Schuler, the CEO of Madrigal Electromotive, the parent company of Gus's Los Pollos Hermanos restaurants; reprising his role from Breaking Bad.
 Laura Fraser as Lydia Rodarte-Quayle, a Madrigal Electromotive executive and a liaison to Gus Fring; reprising her role from Breaking Bad.
 Daniel Moncada and Luis Moncada as Leonel and Marco Salamanca (the Cousins), enforcers and hitmen for the Juárez Cartel.
 Steven Bauer as Don Eladio Vuente, the head of the Juarez drug cartel.
 Roy Wood Jr. as Grant, an Albuquerque public defender.

Production

Development 
On July 28, 2018, AMC renewed Better Call Saul for a fifth season, just prior to the airing of the fourth season. At the time of renewal, the number of episodes had yet to be specified, and even after the conclusion of the fourth season in October 2018, series co-creator Peter Gould said they were still in discussions with Sony Pictures Television for how long the fifth season would be, given that Better Call Saul had a finite amount of content. In November 2019, AMC confirmed that the fifth season would have ten episodes and would debut on February 23, 2020. On what to expect in the fifth season, Gould said that Jimmy McGill / Saul Goodman's first move is "to try to leverage all the contacts he has in the world of selling drop phones." He also posed a question about Saul's reputation "as not just a criminal lawyer but a  lawyer?".

Casting 

Main cast members Bob Odenkirk, Jonathan Banks, Rhea Seehorn, Patrick Fabian, Michael Mando, and Giancarlo Esposito return from previous seasons as Jimmy McGill / Saul Goodman, Mike Ehrmantraut, Kim Wexler, Howard Hamlin, Nacho Varga, and Gus Fring, respectively. Tony Dalton, who recurred in season four as Lalo Salamanca, was promoted to the main cast for the fifth season. 

In January 2020, it was announced that Breaking Bad actors Dean Norris and Steven Michael Quezada would reprise their roles as Hank Schrader and Steven Gomez, along with actor Robert Forster who appeared posthumously as Ed Galbraith. The first episode of the season was dedicated to Forster. Bill Burr was set to return as Patrick Kuby in "Dedicado a Max", but scheduling fell through due to him needing to attend to a personal matter.

Filming 
Filming for the fifth season began on April 10, 2019, in Albuquerque, New Mexico, and ended in September 2019.

In the first scene of the season, Jimmy hides his real identity under his Gene Takavic alias while working at a Cinnabon in a shopping mall in Omaha, Nebraska. The Cinnabon scenes in Better Call Saul are set in Omaha, but are filmed at the Cottonwood Mall in Albuquerque.

Series co-creator Vince Gilligan, who is also the creator of Breaking Bad, said that the episode "Bagman" was the most "challenging" episode he has had to direct so far.

Episodes

Broadcast 
In the United States, the season debuted with a two-night premiere on Sunday, February 23, 2020, and Monday, February 24, where it returned to its regular timeslot. In the weeks prior to the premiere, AMC had aired a Breaking Bad marathon leading into the AMC premiere showing of El Camino: A Breaking Bad Movie as lead-in to Better Call Sauls fifth season. Regarding the decision to air the fifth season nearly a year and a half after the fourth, Sarah Barnett, the president of the entertainment networks group at AMC Networks, said the long hiatus was "driven by talent needs, which we would not override if it would result in a worse show".

In certain international markets, like previous seasons, the fifth season was released on Netflix with episodes available the day after the episodes were broadcast on AMC.

Reception

Critical response 

The fifth season of Better Call Saul received universal acclaim from television critics. On Rotten Tomatoes, the season has an approval rating of 99% based on 184 reviews, with an average rating of 8.9/10. The website's critical consensus reads, "Grounded by Bob Odenkirk's endlessly nuanced, lived-in performance, Better Call Sauls fifth season is a darkly funny, vividly realized master class in tragedy." On Metacritic, the season has a score of 92 out of 100 based on 16 critics, indicating "universal acclaim".

Kelly Connolly of TV Guide gave it 4.5/5 stars and wrote that Better Call Saul is better than other prequels, saying that the series "understands that the tragedy of fate is baked into the story." Writing for Collider, Adam Chitwood gave it a perfect 5/5 star review, stating that the series might have become even better than Breaking Bad, and describing its execution as "unparalleled by anything on television right now". Daniel D'Addario of Variety gave the first few episodes a positive review, saying "Better Call Saul, in the early going of its fifth and penultimate season, remains the picture of white-knuckled but real restraint." Jen Chaney of Vulture said that Kim's development into a similar character as Jimmy made viewing the fifth season a more "nerve-wracking experience than usual, in the best, albeit still anxiety-provoking way."

The final few episodes of the season were highlighted by Alison Herman from The Ringer, as she mentioned that they finally had the two stories of Better Call Saul, Jimmy's story involving legal work, and Mike's story involving the drug cartel, fully intersect after several seasons to a great effect. The episode "Bagman" received universal acclaim from critics and audiences, with some considering it to be the series' best episode. The following episode "Bad Choice Road" received similar acclaim.

Rhea Seehorn's performance as Kim during the fifth season was seen by some critics as the stand-out performance of the season. Both from Rolling Stone, Alan Sepinwall described her as the "MVP of Better Call Saul", and Brian Tallerico referred to Seehorn's work as "one of the best performances on any show in the last decade". Liz Shannon Miller of Collider wrote in regards to her Emmy snub, "Seehorn in particular hurts after turning in career-best work; Kim Wexler's journey in Season 5 was a heartbreaking, even chilling experience". The final scene from "Bad Choice Road" in which Kim stands up to Lalo for Jimmy was highlighted by CNN's Brian Lowry, saying that it has "really been Seehorn's year, crystallizing what has drawn Kim to Jimmy" and that it showed the "character's strength". TVLine named Seehorn their "Performer of the Week" for her performance in "Bad Choice Road", particularity the final scene. They wrote that Seehorn was "delivering one of the best performances on TV" and "is the best thing that ever happened to Better Call Saul."

Critics' top ten list

Ratings

Accolades

In response to the Emmy nominations, several critics felt that Odenkirk (who had been nominated for each previous season) and Seehorn were significant snubs.

Home media
The fifth season was released on Blu-ray and DVD in region 1 on November 24, 2020. The set contains all 10 episodes, plus cast and crew audio commentaries on every episode, deleted scenes, and various behind-the-scenes featurettes.

Related media

Ethics Training with Kim Wexler
AMC released ten mini-episodes of Ethics Training with Kim Wexler alongside the fifth season of Better Call Saul, which were presented on both YouTube and AMC's social media sites. It follows similar series Los Pollos Hermanos Employee Training w/ Gus Fring for season three and Madrigal Electromotive Security Training presented by Mike Ehrmantraut for the fourth season. The ethics training videos are presented as continuing education videos mixing live-action segments of Kim with Jimmy filming her behind the scenes along with animated segments, and are a product of "Saul Goodman Productions". The animated segments include nods to both Better Call Saul and Breaking Bad. The web series won the award for Outstanding Short Form Comedy or Drama Series at the 72nd Primetime Creative Arts Emmy Awards.

Notes

References

External links 
  – official site
 
 

2020 American television seasons
Season 5
Television series set in 2004